Eunidia camerunica is a species of beetle in the family Cerambycidae. It was described by Téocchi, Sudre and Jiroux in 2010.

Subspecies
 Eunidia camerunica camerunica Téocchi, 1994
 Eunidia camerunica gabonicola Téocchi, Jiroux & Sudre, 2004

References

Eunidiini
Beetles described in 2010